The 2014 San Bernardino mayoral election was held on February 4, 2014, to elect the mayor of San Bernardino, California. It saw the election of R. Carey Davis.

No runoff was necessary. 

Municipal elections in California are officially non-partisan.

Results

References 

San Bernardino
Mayoral elections in San Bernardino, California
San Bernardino